Carbon Brief is a UK-based website specialising in the science and policy of climate change. It has won awards for investigative journalism and data visualisation. Leo Hickman is the director and editor for Carbon Brief.

Founding
Carbon Brief is funded by the European Climate Foundation, and has their office located in London. The website was established in response to the Climategate controversy.

Reception
The New York Times climate team's newsletter in May 2018 highlighted a CarbonBrief article about solar climate engineering, as insightful.

Carbon Brief's climate-and-energy coverage is often cited by news outlets, or climate related websites. YALE Climate Communications highlighted a summary of climate model projections, a 2011 The Guardian article quoted then-editor Christian Hunt, in 2017 The New York Times cited climate scientist Zeke Hausfather, and in 2018 MIT Technology Review cited an analysis on emissions scenarios.

Awards
The Royal Statistical Society gave Carbon Brief a Highly Commended award for investigative journalism in 2018, for the article Mapped: How UK foreign aid is spent on climate change, authored by Leo Hickman and Rosamund Pearce, and in 2020 in the category data visualisation for How the UK transformed its electricity supply in just a decade. In 2017, Carbon Brief won The Drum Online Media Award for "Best Specialist Site for Journalism". 

Carbon Brief's editor Leo Hickman was named 2020 Editor of the Year by the Association of British Science Writers. The judges commented:

See also
Climate Central
Skeptical Science

References

External links
CarbonBrief

Companies based in the London Borough of Southwark
British science websites
Climate change blogs
British environmental websites
Internet properties established in 2010